Hans Christoph Diderik Victor von Levetzow (1754-1829) was a Danish noble and government official. He served as the Diocesan Governor in Iceland from 1785 until 1789. He was then transferred to Norway where he served as the Diocesand Governor of Christianssand stiftamt (and simultaneously as the County Governor of Nedenæs amt from 1789 until 1800. He was then sent to be the County Governor of Husum and Bredstedt counties in Denmark from 1800 until 1826. From 1826 until his death in 1829, he was the administrator of the County of Rantzau in Holstein.

References

1754 births
1829 deaths
County governors of Norway